was a Japanese professional baseball catcher. He spent most of his career with the Nishitetsu Lions of Nippon Professional Baseball, and died of pancreatic cancer in Fukuoka in 2009.

References

External links
 

1937 births
2009 deaths
Sportspeople from Ōita Prefecture
Nishitetsu Lions players
Nippon Professional Baseball coaches
Nippon Professional Baseball catchers
Deaths from pancreatic cancer
Deaths from cancer in Japan
People from Usuki, Ōita